Palace lanterns are traditional Chinese handicrafts by the Han Chinese used during various Chinese festivals. The genesis for the art form was created during the Eastern Han dynasty, and blossomed during the Sui and Tang dynasties. In accordance with its name, palace lanterns are used as lamps in palaces. They are often made using fine wood as a skeleton and decorated with spun silk and glass with coloured drawings or patterns in surface of the lantern. Due to the fact that it was used for the palace for a long time, apart from the lighting feature, they were also elaborately embellished, in order to show the wealth and luxury of the emperor. Orthodox palace lantern generally has anise, hexagonal, four corners, the pattern of each face may be "Dragon and phoenix bringing auspiciousness ", "Live for a long time", and  "Everything goes well".

History 
Palace lanterns have been around for thousands of years in China. It has become a symbol of traditional Chinese culture. The palace lantern, as a special arts and crafts of handicraft production in China, enjoys a high reputation in the world. Up till now, palace lanterns are still found adorning luxury halls and residences.

The palace lantern, hanging on the beam of the hall, is generally bigger and embedded tapestry or glass, with the nice effect of adornment. According to legend, after the establishment of the Eastern Han Dynasty to the Han Dynasty emperor Liu Xiu, the capital of Luoyang, in order to celebrate this achievement, the emperor commanded that the palace are compelled to decorate with all kinds of beautiful lanterns and hold a big banquets to reward the people who followed him to establish the country. Later, the technology of the palace lantern was introduced to the commoners. Thus, the name "palace lantern" was born. On January 15 of the first year of emperor Suiyangdi, the palace lanterns were scattered throughout the city, decorating the city for half a month. After the Sui and Tang dynasties, on the Lantern Festival, all the family hung their treasured lamps highly, wherever is light and bright. The custom spread to the whole country and overseas.

In the Qing dynasty, it become a reward from the emperor to dukes and ministers.

Development
In 1279, naval warfare between Song and Yuan broke out in Jiangmen, which changed the dynasty, since that the southern Song dynasty perished. After the war, the artists fled to Jiangmen coastal area. One of the artists called Li and his descendants constantly made palace lanterns. Around the years of Guangxu, one of his descendants, called Li Xiyan, founded an industry of palace lanterns in Jiangmen. 
In 1902, Jiangmen was set of commercial port. With the gradually flourishing commercial and the frequently diplomacy, the industry of palace lantern bloomed. 
In 1930, the son of Li Xiyan called Li Fa inherited property and made the palace lantern reborn. In the mid 1940s, due to the long-term civil war, Li Fa's wife worried that the native cultural heritage would gradually become extinct. She came to Beijing to visit the forbidden city in two years, depicting the palace accessories with drawing pictures directly, and recorded comments. 
After the 1940s, Mr. Li's business gradually shifted to Hong Kong. He transform the image which was drawn by his wife into modern lanterns. In 1949, the palace lantern obtained the structure patent of the United Kingdom, and was the first patent in the history of China's lighting industry.
The palace lanterns are different from any fixtures. It is the product of lighting and the perfect combination of arts and crafts, which is unique in the world. The palace lanterns have practical value, Oriental art and national style in China. It is rich in culture and art appreciation value.

Gilt Bronze Human-Shaped Lamp
Gilt Bronze Human-Shaped Lamp, Han Chinese bronzes, unearthed from the tomb of Dou Wan in Mancheng, Hebei province, in 1968. It was displayed in China 2010 Shanghai World Expo. the Lantern is a full-bodied gilt setting maid who were holding the lamps, with an elegance expression. The body height of 48 cm, 15.85 kg. Gilt Bronze Human-Shaped Lamp was designed skillfully. on the on hand, the maid hand the lamp, on the other hand her sleeve seemed to prohibit form the wind. Actually, it is for the tubes to absorb smoke and avoid the air pollution. This Palace lantern got its name, because it has been placed in the long Palace of Dou Taihou (Liu Sheng grandmother). Nowadays, it was collected in the museum of Hebei province.

Features 
height:48 cm, Odalisque:44.5 cm, weight:15.85 kg.
The body was golden and it looks splendid and gorgeous. Gilding bronze has appeared in the Warring States period. After the gilding treatment of bronze, its surface will be beautiful, and it also plays a very important role in the protection for the bronze.

Inscriptions 
There are nine engraved inscriptions on some parts of the lamp body, a total of 65 words. Around the upper bottom of the lamp holder was engraved with the inscription"" (some Chinese characters). The handwriting of the inscription is too illegible, it may have been carved later, so the "长信尚浴" does not seem to be the first owner of the lamp. The original owner should be first carved, and the handwriting is neatly, so the six parts of the lamp body which was carved with "阳信家" illustrated that the lamp is originally belongs to the "阳信家".
There was "长信"(Changxin)on the lamp, used for residence of Dou empress dowager, named "Changxin Palace lanterns".

Value 
Changxin Palace lantern changed the style of the old bronze vessels which was mystery, the whole shape and the style of decoration seemed to stretch freely, light and magnificent. It is a practical and beautiful lamp treasures. The maid in the statue is hollow, her right arm and empty sleeves form a copper lamp shade can freely open and close. The burning dust would  not disturb to the surrounding environment, it would deposit in the lamp. The concept of environmental protection of the ancient Chinese people's wisdom. the Changxin Palace lantern was known as "China's first light". Former U.S. Secretary of state Kissinger made a trip to China to visit Changxin Palace lanterns, and laments: " Chinese have understood the environmental protection since 2000 years ago, it is really great."
Changxin Palace lantern has been regarded as an important representative of the pinnacle of national arts and crafts. This is not only because of its rarity, the one and only, but also in its exquisite production process and unique artistic conception. Experts on archaeology and history of metallurgy agree that the exquisite design and production process of the lamp are high level, leading the palace lantern in the Han Dynasty. In 1993 it was identified as a national treasure heritage.

Luoyang palace lantern 
Luoyang palace lantern is a characteristic of traditional crafts and the common ornament on Lantern Festival, with strong local characteristics.  he white square lamp, butterflies lamp, etc. are common. Especially, the red yarn lamp is the most famous. It has beautiful shape, and is easy to paint. Not only can be used for festive ornaments, but also art propaganda.

History
Luoyang palace lantern has a long history; it was created in Eastern Han Dynasty, flourishing in the Sui and Tang Dynasties. According to legend, after the establishment of the Eastern Han Dynasty to the Han Dynasty emperor Liu Xiu, the capital of Luoyang, in order to celebrate this achievement, the emperor commanded that the palace are compelled to decorate with all kinds of beautiful lantern and hold a big banquets to reward the people who follow him to establish the country. Later, the technology of palace lantern was introduced to the folk. Thus, The name "palace lantern" was born. On January 15 of the first year of emperor Suiyangdi, the palace lantern scattered throughout the city, decorating the city half a months. After the sui and tang dynasties, on the Lantern Festival, all the family hung their treasure lamp highly, wherever is light and bright. The custom spread to the whole country and overseas.The Song Dynasty, Luoyang suffered from wars over and over again, the Lantern Festival gradually lost its presence, but the technology of lantern production has been passed down to now.

References 

Chinese handicrafts
Light fixtures